Phosphorus pentasulfide is the inorganic compound with the formula  (monomer) or  (dimer). This yellow solid is the one of two phosphorus sulfides of commercial value. Samples often appear greenish-gray due to impurities. It is soluble in carbon disulfide but reacts with many other solvents such as alcohols, DMSO, and DMF.

Structure and synthesis
Its tetrahedral molecular structure is similar to that of adamantane and almost identical to the structure of phosphorus pentoxide.

Applications
The compound is mainly converted to other derivatives for use as lubrication additives such as zinc dithiophosphates. 
It is widely used in the production of sodium dithiophosphate for applications as a flotation agent in the concentration of molybdenite minerals. It is also used in the production of pesticides such as Parathion and Malathion. It is also a component of some amorphous solid electrolytes (e.g. -) for some types of lithium batteries.

Phosphorus pentasulfide is a dual-use material, for the production of early insecticides such as Amiton and also for the manufacture of the related VX nerve agents.

Reactivity
Due to hydrolysis by atmospheric moisture,  evolves hydrogen sulfide , thus  is associated with a rotten egg odour.

Aromatic compounds such as anisole, ferrocene and 1-methoxynaphthalene react to form 1,3,2,4-dithiadiphosphetane 2,4-disulfides such as Lawesson's reagent.

 is used as a thionation reagent. Reactions of this type require refluxing solvents such as benzene, dioxane, or acetonitrile with  dissociating into . Some ketones, esters, and imides are converted to the corresponding thiocarbonyls. Amides give thioamides. With 1,4-diketones the reagent forms thiophenes. It is also used to deoxygenate sulfoxides. The use of  has been displaced by the aforementioned Lawesson's reagent.

 reacts with pyridine to form the complex .

References

Inorganic phosphorus compounds
Sulfides
Adamantane-like molecules